Bidipta Chakraborty is an Indian actress who predominantly works in Bengali films. She had appeared in Debesh Chattopadhyay's play Brain.

Personal life 
Bidipta was born to eminent theatre actor Biplab Ketan Chakraborty and dancer Dipali Chakraborty. Her two sisters Sudipta Chakraborty and Bidisha Chakraborty are also actresses. Bidipta married film director Birsa Dasgupta in 2010. Chaitali Dasgupta and Raja Dasgupta are her mother-in-law and father-in-law respectively.

Filmography 
 Bijoyar Pore (2022)
 Mon Kharap (2022)
 Bismillah (2022)
 Sohorer Upokotha (2021)
 Dracula Sir (2020)
 Purba Paschim Dakshin (2019)
 Nagarkirtan (2019)
 Rosogolla (2018)
 Load shedding (2015) Directed by Soukarya Ghosal
 Meghe Dhaka Tara (2013)
 Ami Aadu (2011)
 Chalo Let's Go (2008)
 Abar Aranye (2003)
 Mr. and Mrs. Iyer (2002)

Short Film/Web Series

Television

See also 
 Tanusree Chakraborty
 Ushasie Chakraborty

References

External links 
 

Living people
Actresses in Bengali cinema
Bengali television actresses
Actresses from Kolkata
Indian stage actresses
Indian film actresses
Indian television actresses
21st-century Indian actresses
1980 births